Pramila Prava Minz is an Indian rower from Odisha. She won a bronze medal in Women coxless pair event with Pratima Puhan of Odisha in the 2010 Asian Games.

Achievements
Wrote rowing history for India by becoming the first woman of the country along with Pratima Puhan to win a medal in 2010 Asian Games.
She and Pratima Puhan claimed a bronze in the coxless pair event, clocking seven minutes and 47.50 seconds at Guangzhou, China on 19 November 2010.

References

Sportswomen from Odisha
Living people
Indian female rowers
Asian Games medalists in rowing
Rowers at the 2010 Asian Games
Asian Games bronze medalists for India
21st-century Indian women
21st-century Indian people
Medalists at the 2010 Asian Games
Year of birth missing (living people)